Woodstock is the shire town (county seat) of Windsor County, Vermont, United States. As of the 2020 census, the town population was 3,005. It includes the villages of Woodstock, South Woodstock, Taftsville, and West Woodstock.

History

Chartered by New Hampshire Governor Benning Wentworth on July 10, 1761, the town was a New Hampshire grant to David Page and 61 others. It was named after Woodstock in Oxfordshire, England, as a homage to both Blenheim Palace and its owner, George Spencer, 4th Duke of Marlborough. The town was first settled in 1768 by James Sanderson and his family. In 1776, Joab Hoisington built a gristmill, followed by a sawmill, on the south branch of the Ottauquechee River. The town was incorporated in 1837.

Although the Revolution slowed settlement, Woodstock developed rapidly once the war ended in 1783. The Vermont General Assembly met here in 1807 before moving the next year to the new capital at Montpelier. Waterfalls in the Ottauquechee River provided water power to operate mills. Factories made scythes and axes, carding machines, and woolens. There was a machine shop and gunsmith shop. Manufacturers also produced furniture, wooden wares, window sashes and blinds. Carriages, horse harnesses, saddles, luggage trunks and leather goods were also manufactured. By 1859, the population was 3,041. The Woodstock Railroad opened to White River Junction on September 29, 1875, carrying freight and tourists. The Woodstock Inn opened in 1892.

The Industrial Revolution helped the town grow prosperous. The economy is now largely driven by tourism. Woodstock has the 20th highest per-capita income of Vermont towns as reported by the United States Census, and a high percentage of homes owned by non-residents. The town's central square, called the Green, is bordered by restored late Georgian, Federal Style, and Greek Revival houses. The cost of real estate in the district adjoining the Green is among the highest in the state. The seasonal presence of wealthy second-home owners from cities such as Boston and New York has contributed to the town's economic vitality and livelihood, while at the same time diminished its accessibility to native Vermonters.

The town maintains a free (paid for through taxation) community wi-fi internet service that covers most of the village of Woodstock, dubbed "Wireless Woodstock".

Layout and design

In his City Life: Urban Expectations in a New World, Canadian author and architect Witold Rybczynski extensively analyzes the layout of the town and the informal and unwritten rules which determined it.  According to Rybczynski:

The author goes on to explicate some of the informal rules, such as that buildings stand close to the sidewalk, in the case of businesses, or ten to fourteen feet behind for homes; that plots are generally deep and narrow, keeping street frontages roughly equivalent; commercial buildings stand side by side, with only important buildings with a public function—the library or courthouse, for instance—being free-standing objects. Rybczynsk points out that there is no zoning in Woodstock, and "buildings with different functions sat—and still sit today—side by side on the same streets", with practical exceptions such as the slaughterhouse and the gasworks.

The Rockefellers have had an enormous impact on the overall character of the town as it exists today. They helped preserve the 19th century architecture and the rural feel. They built the Woodstock Inn, a center point for the town. Laurance and Mary French Rockefeller also had the village's power lines buried underground. To protect their ridgeline views, the town adopted an ordinance creating a Scenic Ridgeline District in order to protect the aesthetics and the views of the town. It was updated in 2007.

Woodstock was named "The Prettiest Small Town in America" by the Ladies Home Journal magazine, and in 2011, North and South Park Street and one block of Elm Street won an award for great streetscape by the American Planning Association's "Great Places in America" program. APA looks at street form and composition, street character and personality and the overall street environment and sustainable practices.

Geography
The Ottauquechee River flows through the town.

Woodstock is crossed by U.S. Route 4, Vermont Route 12 and Vermont Route 106. Interstate 89 does not pass through the town, it is served by exit 1 in nearby Quechee. It is bordered the town of Pomfret to the north, Hartford to the northeast, Hartland to the east, Reading to the south, and Bridgewater to the west.

It is easily accessible via car or plane to Rutland or Lebanon Airports. Vermont Translines operates a daily intercity bus route between Rutland and Lebanon, stopping in Woodstock along the way. The closest regular public transportation hubs are in White River Junction ( east) and Rutland ( west).

Climate
This climatic region is typified by large seasonal temperature differences, with warm to hot (and often humid) summers and cold (sometimes severely cold) winters.  According to the Köppen Climate Classification system, Woodstock has a humid continental climate, abbreviated "Dfb" on climate maps.

Demographics

As of the census of 2010, there were 3,048 people, 1,388 households, and 877 families residing in the town.  The population density was 72.6 people per square mile (28.0/km2).  There were 1,775 housing units at an average density of 39.9 per square mile (15.4/km2).  The racial makeup of the town was 98.08% White, 0.40% Black or African American, 0.22% Native American, 0.62% Asian, 0.25% from other races, and 0.43% from two or more races. Hispanic or Latino of any race were 0.80% of the population.

There were 1,388 households, out of which 26.4% had children under the age of 18 living with them, 52.7% were couples living together and joined in either marriage or civil union, 8.1% had a female householder with no husband present, and 36.8% were non-families. 29.7% of all households were made up of individuals, and 11.3% had someone living alone who was 65 years of age or older.  The average household size was 2.24 and the average family size was 2.79.

In the town, the population was spread out, with 20.7% under the age of 18, 4.9% from 18 to 24, 23.9% from 25 to 44, 31.7% from 45 to 64, and 18.8% who were 65 years of age or older.  The median age was 45 years. For every 100 females, there were 94.0 males.  For every 100 females age 18 and over, there were 90.6 males.

The median income for a household in the town was $47,143, and the median income for a family was $57,330. Males had a median income of $33,229 versus $26,769 for females. The per capita income for the town was $28,326.  About 4.3% of families and 6.4% of the population were below the poverty line, including 8.3% of those under age 18 and 3.7% of those age 65 or over.

Arts and culture

Annual cultural events
 The annual Bookstock literary festival is held in June on and around the central village green and features regional, national and international authors and poets. Past speakers include Julia Alvarez, Richard Blanco, Billy Collins, Ed Koren, Sy Montgomery, Valerie Plame, Richard Russo, Ocean Vuong.
 The annual Harvest Weekend at the Billings Farm and Museum is held in October and includes a husking bee, barn dance, and 19th century harvest activities.
 The annual Wassail Weekend is held in early December.

Tourism
The Billings Farm & Museum is a local tourist attraction. The land and farmhouse were owned by Laurance Rockefeller and his wife Mary French Rockefeller. The farm and museum include an operating dairy farm and a restored 1890 farm house.

F. H. Gillingham & Sons, a general store located in its original building at 16 Elm Street, is another local tourist attraction. The store was established in 1886 by Frank Henry Gillingham.

Parks and recreation
The Marsh-Billings-Rockefeller National Historical Park is located in Woodstock, and is the only unit of the United States National Park System in Vermont (except for the Appalachian Trail). The park preserves the site where Frederick Billings established a managed forest and a progressive dairy farm.

Education
Woodstock is served by Woodstock Elementary School, The Prosper Valley School, and Woodstock Union High School & Middle School. The schools are part of the Windsor Central Supervisory Union.

Local government

Notable people

 Fred C. Ainsworth, U.S. Army surgeon and Adjutant General
 Ivan Albright, artist
 Benjamin Allen, politician
 Nicholas Baylies, Associate Justice of the Vermont Supreme Court
 Franklin S. Billings, 60th Governor of Vermont
 Franklin S. Billings Jr., Chief Justice Vermont Supreme Court & United States District Court for the District of Vermont
 Franklin Noble Billings, businessman and brother of Frederick H. Billings
 Frederick H. Billings, lawyer, financier and President of the Northern Pacific Railway
 Keegan Bradley, PGA Tour golfer
 Richard M. Brett, conservationist and author
 Isaac Bullard (Vermont religious leader)
 Frank H. Chapman, US Marshal for Vermont
 Sylvester Churchill, journalist
 Jacob Collamer, politician
 Philip Cummings, lecturer on world affairs
 Thomas M. Debevoise, Vermont Attorney General, Dean of Vermont Law School
 George Dewey, admiral
 Maud Durbin, actress and wife of Otis Skinner
Harold "Duke" Eaton Jr., Supreme Court Justice, State of Vermont
 Elon Farnsworth, Attorney General of Michigan
 Marianne Gaillard Faulkner, philanthropist
 Robert Hager, television journalist
 Benjamin Tyler Henry, gunsmith and manufacturer
 Rebecca Hammond Lard, poet from Indiana
 Charles Marsh, U.S. congressman
 George Perkins Marsh, environmentalist
 Joseph A. Mower, general
 Hiram Powers, sculptor
 Origen D. Richardson, politician
 Laurance Rockefeller, American businessman, financier, philanthropist and major conservationist. Financier of the Woodstock Inn & Resort
 Otis Skinner, actor
 Charles Stimets, First Town Manager of Woodstock 
 Benjamin Swan, longest serving Vermont State Treasurer
 Andrew Tracy, U.S. congressman
 Gwen Verdon, dancer and actress
 Peter T. Washburn, 31st Governor of Vermont
 Hezekiah Williams, U.S. congressman
 Norman Williams, Vermont Auditor of Accounts and Secretary of State of Vermont
 Paul Watson, Conservationist, author and television star
 Daphne Zuniga, film and television actress

In popular culture
Several movies have been filmed in or around Woodstock, including Dr. Cook's Garden (1971), Ghost Story (1981) and Funny Farm (1988).

Sites of interest
 Billings Farm & Museum
 Lincoln Covered Bridge, built in 1877
 Marsh-Billings-Rockefeller National Historical Park
 F. H. Gillingham & Sons
 Middle Covered Bridge, built in 1969
 Taftsville Covered Bridge, built in 1836
 First Congregational Church of Woodstock, Vermont
 Town Hall Theatre
 Woodstock Historical Society & Dana House Museum

Related
 Woodstock Observer
Woodstock Railway
Billings Library, University of Vermont

References

External links

 Town of Woodstock official website
 Norman Williams Public Library
 Woodstock Area Chamber of Commerce
 The Vermont Standard, local newspaper
 ePodunk

 
Towns in Vermont
County seats in Vermont
Towns in Windsor County, Vermont
Populated places established in 1761
1761 establishments in the Thirteen Colonies